Streptomyces carpinensis is a bacterium species from the genus of Streptomyces which has been isolated from soil from Carpina in Pernambuco in Brazil.

See also 
 List of Streptomyces species

References

Further reading

External links
Type strain of Streptomyces carpinensis at BacDive – the Bacterial Diversity Metadatabase

carpinensis
Bacteria described in 1986